The Laird Baby Biplane was the second aircraft built by Matty Laird in the United States of America.

Design and development
The Baby Biplane was built by Laird at the age of 16, with assistance from his brother Charles.

The Baby Biplane was a single-seat biplane made of wood with aircraft fabric covering, having conventional landing gear. Later the aircraft was covered with Irish Linen and French cellulose-nitrate dope.

Operational history
Laird operated from Chicago's Cicero field. A self-taught pilot, his first flight resulted in the aircraft flipping over after becoming airborne. Over time, the aircraft flew up to 30 minutes at a time. The instrument panel consisted of a pocket watch, used to time the fuel supply.

Aircraft on display
A replica of the Baby Biplane was built by Dean Tilton and donated to the Florida Air Museum in Lakeland, Florida, United States.

Specifications (Baby Biplane)

References

External links

 Image of the Baby Biplane in the Florida Air Museum

Biplanes
Aerobatic aircraft
Baby biplane